New Pump-House, also known as the Byrd Park Pump House, is a historic pumping station building located in Byrd Park, Richmond, Virginia.  It was built in 1881–1883, and is a three-part, "I" plan, Gothic Revival style granite building.  A one-story, L-shaped annex was built in 1905.  The building features a steeply pitched roof, projecting gables, Gothic arches, and lancet windows.  Also on the property are the contributing Beaux Arts style 1924 Hydro Electric Pumping Station constructed of brick, concrete, and stucco and the 1881 Worthington Steam Pump Building, a one-story Italianate style pump house built of brick coated with stucco.  The complex was built as the waterworks for the city of Richmond.

It was listed on the National Register of Historic Places in 2002.

References

External links

Historic American Engineering Record in Virginia
Industrial buildings and structures on the National Register of Historic Places in Virginia
Italianate architecture in Virginia
Gothic Revival architecture in Virginia
Beaux-Arts architecture in Virginia
Buildings and structures completed in 1881
Buildings and structures in Richmond, Virginia
National Register of Historic Places in Richmond, Virginia
Water supply pumping stations on the National Register of Historic Places
1881 establishments in Virginia